'Yerevan State University may refer to:

Yerevan State University
Yerevan State Linguistic University
Yerevan State Medical University